Robert Tvorogal (born 5 October 1994 in Vilnius) is a male artistic gymnast from Lithuania. He represented Lithuania at the 2016 Summer Olympics.

Biography 

He became the first Lithuanian competitor in gymnastics at the Youth Olympics. He is ethnic Polish. He graduated from Szymon Konarski Polish High School. Robert Tvorogal has also represented his country at 2016 Olympics and was the first Lithuanian that claimed gold in the FIG World Challenge Cup at Osijek in Croatia.

Robert Tvorogal won gold medal at the European Games in Minsk in 2019

In 2020 Tvorogal become first Lithuanian male artistic gymnast to win European champion title.

Achievements

References

External links
 Biography at FIG website

1994 births
Living people
Lithuanian people of Polish descent
Lithuanian male artistic gymnasts
Olympic gymnasts of Lithuania
European champions in gymnastics
European Games medalists in gymnastics
European Games gold medalists for Lithuania
Gymnasts at the 2010 Summer Youth Olympics
Gymnasts at the 2016 Summer Olympics
Gymnasts at the 2019 European Games
Gymnasts at the 2020 Summer Olympics